Destin was a 74-gun ship of the French Navy.

Career 
In 1778, Destin cruised in the Eastern Mediterranean. In 1780, she was appointed to the squadrons bound for America. She took part in the Battle of the Chesapeake on 5 September 1781, and in the Battle of the Saintes on 12 April 1782.

In August 1782, Flotte was given command of Destin, succeeding Goimpy. He sailed to Cadiz to reinforce the fleet under Córdova.

In 1783, she was laid up in ordinary at Toulon. During the Siege of Toulon, she was seized by the Royalist insurgents and surrendered to the British, who scuttled her when they had to evacuate the city in December 1793.

Fate 
The sunken Destin was raised in 1807, and the wreck was broken up.

Citations and references 
Citations

References
 
 
  (1671-1870)
 

Ships of the line of the French Navy
César-class ships of the line
1777 ships
Ships built in France